The Naypyitaw Union Territory, also called Naypyitaw Council Territory (Naypyitaw also spelled Nay Pyi Taw, Naypyidaw or Nay Pyi Daw) is an administrative division in central Myanmar (Burma). It contains Naypyidaw, the capital city of Myanmar.

Administrative divisions
The Naypyidaw Union Territory consists of the following districts and townships:
 Ottara District (also known as North Naypyidaw)
 Ottarathiri Township
 Pobbathiri Township
 Tatkone Township
 Zeyathiri Township
 Dekkhina District (also known as South Naypyidaw)
 Dekkhinathiri Township
 Lewe Township
 Pyinmana Township
 Zabuthiri Township

Administration
Naypyidaw Union Territory is under the direct administration of the President. Day-to-day functions are carried out on the President's behalf by the Naypyidaw Council led by a Chairperson. The Chairperson and members of the Naypyidaw Council are appointed by the President and include both civilians and Armed Forces representatives.

On 30 March 2011, President Thein Sein appointed Thein Nyunt as chairman of the Naypyidaw Council, along with 9 chair members: Than Htay, Colonel Myint Aung Than, Kan Chun, Paing Soe, Saw Hla, Myint Swe, Myint Shwe and Myo Nyunt.

Demographics

The 2014 Myanmar Census reported that Naypyidaw Union Territory had a population of 1,160,242. The population density was 164.4 people per km2. The census reported that the median age was 26.8 years, and 95 males per 100 females. There were 262,253 households; the mean household size was 4.1.

Religion 
According to the 2014 Myanmar Census, Buddhists make up 96.8% of Naypyidaw Union Territory's population, forming the largest religious community there. Minority religious communities include Christians (1.1%), Muslims (2.1%), and Hindus (0%) who collectively comprise the remainder of Naypyidaw Union Territory's population.

According to the State Sangha Maha Nayaka Committee’s 2016 statistics, 10,956 Buddhist monks were registered in Naypyidaw Union Territory, comprising 2% of Myanmar's total Sangha membership, which includes both novice samanera and fully-ordained bhikkhu. The majority of monks belong to the Thudhamma Nikaya (98.2%), followed by Shwegyin Nikaya (1.8%), with the remainder of monks belonging to other small monastic orders. 923 thilashin were registered in Naypyidaw Union Territory, comprising 1.5% of Myanmar's total thilashin community.

References

Districts of Myanmar
Mandalay Region
Naypyidaw